Francis Xavier Irwin (January 9, 1934 – October 30, 2019) was an American prelate of the Roman Catholic Church who served as an Auxiliary Bishop of the Archdiocese of Boston from 1996 to 2009.

Biography
Irwin was born in Medford, Massachusetts, one of seven children. He attended Boston College High School, Boston College, and St. John Seminary. He was ordained a priest by Cardinal Richard Cushing on February 2, 1960. He held a variety of pastoral assignments and worked for almost twenty years at Catholic Charities.

He was consecrated a bishop by Cardinal Bernard Law on September 17, 1996 and served as Regional Bishop of the North Region of the Archdiocese of Boston.

Pope Benedict XVI accepted his resignation on October 20, 2009.

He died on October 30, 2019, at his home on Cape Cod.

References

External links
Roman Catholic Archdiocese of Boston

 

1934 births
2019 deaths
20th-century Roman Catholic bishops in the United States
21st-century Roman Catholic bishops in the United States
People from Medford, Massachusetts
Religious leaders from Massachusetts
Roman Catholic Archdiocese of Boston